DVD Decrypter is a deprecated software application for Microsoft Windows that can create backup disk images of the DVD-Video structure of DVDs.  It can be used to make a copy of any DVD protected with Content Scrambling System (CSS).  The program can also record images to disc — functionality that the author has now incorporated into a separate product called ImgBurn. The software also allows a copy of a region-specific DVD to be made region free. It also removes Macrovision content protection, CSS, region codes, and user operation prohibition.

Legality in the United States
As DVD Decrypter facilitates the removal of copy restrictions, certain uses may be illegal under the United States Digital Millennium Copyright Act unless making copies that are covered under the Fair Use doctrine (or in some cases illegal even when making copies under fair use). In countries without similar laws there may not be any legal restrictions.

On June 6, 2005, the developer, Lightning UK!, announced via the CD Freaks website that he received a cease and desist letter from Macrovision. He later stated it was within his best interests to comply with the letter, and stopped development of the program.  By June 7, 2005, a mirror site was up, which allowed people to download the final version (3.5.4.0).  On November 27, 2005, Afterdawn.com, a Finnish website, announced that it complied with a letter received from Macrovision demanding that DVD Decrypter be taken down from its site.

Under United States federal law, making a backup copy of a DVD-Video or an audio CD by a consumer is legal under fair use protection. However, this provision of United States law conflicts with the Digital Millennium Copyright Act prohibition of so-called "circumvention measures" of copy protections.

In the "321" case, Federal District Judge Susan Illston of the Northern District of California, ruled that the backup copies made with software such as DVD Decrypter are legal but that distribution of the software used to make them is illegal.

In 2010, the Librarian of Congress instituted a DMCA exemption which protects circumvention of CSS protection under certain circumstances. This exemption expired in 2013.

On October 4, 2005, Lightning UK! continued the development of the burning engine used by DVD Decrypter in his new tool, ImgBurn. However, for legal reasons, ImgBurn does not have the ability to circumvent copy protections of encrypted DVDs.

See also
 DeCSS
 DVD ripper (list of various related programs)

References

DVD rippers
United States Internet case law
Windows-only software
Discontinued software